The North Alabama Conference is an Annual Conference (a regional episcopal area, similar to a diocese) of the United Methodist Church. This conference serves the northern half of the state of Alabama, with its administrative offices and the office of the bishop located in Birmingham, AL. It is part of the Southeastern Jurisdictional Conference. The bishop is the Reverend Doctor Debra Wallace-Padgett.

Bishops
1944-1948 Bishop Costen J. Harrell, D.D.
1948-1952 Bishop Clare Purcell
1984-1992 Bishop J. Lloyd Knox
1992-2004: Bishop Robert Eugene Fannin
2004-2012 Bishop Will Willimon, D.D
2012–present: Bishop Debra Wallace-Padgett

Districts
The North Alabama Annual Conference is further subdivided into eight smaller regions, called "districts," which provide further administrative functions for the operation of local churches in cooperation with each other. This structure is vital to Methodism, and is referred to as connectionalism. The Districts that comprise the North Alabama Conference are: Central, Cheaha, Mountain Lakes, Northeast, Northwest, South Central, Southeast, and
Southwest. It used to include the former districts of: Albertsville District, Huntsville District, and Gadsden District.

External links
 North Alabama Conference official website

United Methodism by region
United Methodist Annual Conferences
Methodism in Alabama